Jacek Olgierd Kurski (born 22 February 1966 in Gdańsk) is a Polish politician and journalist, and the current chairman of the Polish public broadcaster Telewizja Polska.

Career
Kurski was first elected to the Sejm on 25 September 2005, getting 26,446 votes in 25 – Gdańsk as a member of the Law and Justice party. He was re-elected in the October 2007 vote and served until 2009 in this capacity.

Kurski was elected to Member of the European Parliament where he served from 2009 to 2014. On 8 September 2010, Kurski was the only MEP to vote against a condemnation by the European Parliament of the execution of Iranian national Sakineh Mohammadi Ashtiani by stoning. Kurski stated that he voted against by error, and he corrected his vote almost immediately.

He then returned to the Sejm where he served as State Undersecretary for the Ministry of Culture and National Heritage for two years.

In January 2016, Kurski became President of Telewizja Polska, and in July 2016 Politico criticized the state broadcaster for strong pro-government bias.

See also
Members of Polish Sejm 2005–2007
Nocna zmiana

References

External links
 Jacek Kurski - parliamentary page - includes declarations of interest, voting record, and transcripts of speeches.

1966 births
Living people
Politicians from Gdańsk
Members of the Polish Sejm 2005–2007
United Poland politicians
United Poland MEPs
Movement for Reconstruction of Poland politicians
MEPs for Poland 2009–2014
Members of the Polish Sejm 2007–2011
University of Gdańsk alumni
Recipient of the Meritorious Activist of Culture badge